The Port Francqui incident, also known as the Port Francqui massacre, was an incident during the Congo Crisis where rogue Armed Forces of the Democratic Republic of the Congo (ANC) forces engaged in combat with UN peacekeepers, primarily from Ghana.

It resulted in the largest loss of life the Ghanaian Armed Forces have ever suffered while peacekeeping.

Prelude
On April 26, 1961, Minister of Interior of Luluabourg Province Emery Wafwana traveled to Port Francqui, where he made a public speech threatening to have the UN forces disarm the ANC.

Wafwana was escorted by the UN to the Hôtel des Palmes in order to avoid roadblocks the ANC had illegally set up in the area, something the local UN forces had tolerated. Hôtel des Palmes was staffed by British Captain Ralph and Lieutenant Brown, Swedish Lieutenant Carl Wilhelm Böttiger and sergeants Egon Åberg and Lars Liedgren, between 20 and 25 Ghanaian soldiers with doctors of various nationality. Between 65 and 70 other Ghanaian soldiers were dispersed in 6 different places around town. The ANC arrived to complain about the speech, where they captured the Swedish and British Officers, who were beaten, before a Swedish doctor persuaded the ANC to release them. There were also reports that a Swedish Officer had hoisted a Compagnie du chemin de fer du bas-Congo au Katanga (BCK) flag on the hotel, which further angered the ANC.

On April 27, the Ghanaian Brigade stationed at Luluabourg received a report of this incident, and two platoons and a reconnaissance contingent were transferred to Port Francqui as a relief force.

Incident
On April 28, 1961, the Ghanaian Brigade from Luluabourg encountered one of the illegal ANC roadblocks, and unaware of the situation, fire was exchanged around 8AM. Ghanaian Private Bemoba was killed while three other Ghanaians were wounded. ANC Sergeant-Major Sangapai and Corporal Bayenga-Nwizi were both killed.

The ANC now felt they were under attack by the UN, and determined to attack the Port Francqui garrison. The British and Swedish officers were taken prisoner and marched to the jungle. Officer Liedgren was forced to walk into the bush, where he was gunned down by the ANC. Next sergeant Åberg was ordered into the bush, however the ANC rifle jammed, and he was ordered to flee by Captain Ralph, which he did while under fire. While Åberg got away, Ralph, Brown and Böttiger were executed, and their bodies thrown into a nearby river.

Concurrently, the ANC attacked the Ghanaian forces of Port Francqui, who were scattered about in poor defensive positions and armed with obsolete No. 4 Lee-Enfield rifles, Sterling and M3 submachine guns and Bren light machine guns whereas the ANC were armed with more modern AK-47 and FN FAL rifles, resulting in a massacre where roughly 43 Ghanaians were either killed or drowned attempting to escape in a nearby river.

Aftermath
The UN launched an investigation into the incident, determining it had been caused by Wafwana's speech. General Henry Templer Alexander, the chief of staff of the Ghanaian Army, attributed the affair to the UN officers' inexperience and the UN's insistence on using persuasion with factions in the Congo instead of armed force. Ghanaian President Kwame Nkrumah rejected this explanation and instead said that it was Alexander's "duty to see that Ghanaian troops were not placed in the kind of impossible position they found themselves in at Port Francqui".

It remains the largest loss of life Ghana has suffered from United Nations peacekeeping missions.

References

Works cited 
 

Congo Crisis
History of the United Nations
Conflicts in 1961
Combat incidents
Military history of Ghana
Democratic Republic of the Congo and the United Nations